Dorymyrmex  is a species of ant in the genus Dorymyrmex. Described by Gallardo in 1916, the species is endemic to Argentina, Paraguay and Venezuela.

References

External links

Dorymyrmex
Hymenoptera of South America
Insects described in 1916